Choi Hyeon-ju (최현주, ; born 6 August 1984, in Jeonbuk) is a South Korean archer. She competed at the 2012 Summer Olympics where she won gold medal in the women's team event.

Career
2012 Summer Olympics
Choi made her Olympic debut at the 2012 London Games as part of the South Korean women's archery team alongside Ki Bo-bae and Lee Sung-jin. The trio collectively finished top of the team standings in the 72-arrow ranking round, which determined the seedings for the subsequent elimination rounds, with Ki and Lee heading the results for the individual event. Choi however struggled with nerves in her first Olympic competition and concluded the round twenty points adrift of her teammates, scoring 651 points from a maximum of 720 and finishing in a distant 21st place.

South Korea were the overwhelming favourites to win the women's team event, and the trio comfortably defeated Denmark and Japan to reach the final against China. After a slow start – in which Choi shot the team's highest score of eight in the first set of arrows – they recovered to win South Korea's seventh successive Olympic gold medal in the discipline. Choi's medal came despite competing with shoulder pain, which she blamed for her form.

Choi reached the last sixteen in the women's individual event, losing in a one arrow shoot-off to France's Berengère Schuh after tying on set points.

See also
 Korean archery
 List of South Korean archers

References

External links
 

South Korean female archers
Living people
1984 births
Olympic archers of South Korea
Archers at the 2012 Summer Olympics
Olympic gold medalists for South Korea
Olympic medalists in archery
Medalists at the 2012 Summer Olympics
Sportspeople from North Jeolla Province
21st-century South Korean women